Pierino medico della Saub (also spelled as Pierino medico della SAUB and Pierino medico della S.A.U.B.) is a 1981 Italian comedy film directed by Giuliano Carnimeo and starring Alvaro Vitali.

Plot
Alvaro Gasperoni, a Roman simpleton, after a school career characterized by the elementary school certificate obtained in Rome, the middle one in Frosinone, the high school one in Catanzaro and the high school one in Canicattì, obtained with relative difficulty a coveted degree in medicine in Addis Ababa (Ethiopia). that the more the schools were in the south, the less they were demanding to issue diplomas. Thanks to his father's powerful recommendation obtained by the P2 Masonic lodge, he soon began working as a doctor in a Roman hospital, surrounded by rampant but equally incompetent colleagues.

The head physician of the clinic states that "the value of a doctor is measured by the number of patients he has", and therefore Alvaro has all his relatives hospitalized to obtain the vice-primary chair, which he actually obtains only to be fired by the councilor for health who, disguised as a simple patient, had been admitted to check the progress of the health facility.

Cast 
Alvaro Vitali as Alvaro Gasperoni / Pippetto
Mario Carotenuto as Mario Gasperoni
Serena Bennato as Domenica
Mario Feliciani as Dr. Tambroni
Pino Ferrara as Dr. Ardito
Angelo Pellegrino as Dr. Ragusa
Anna Campori as Sister Celestina
Ester Carloni as Grandma
Enzo Garinei as Examiner
Gianni Ciardo as Nicola
Ennio Antonelli as Uncle Nando
Sabrina Siani as Nurse
Dino Cassio as Male Nurse
Fernando Cerulli as Inspector

See also 
 List of Italian films of 1981

References

External links

Pierino medico della Saub at Variety Distribution

Italian comedy films
1981 comedy films
1981 films
Films directed by Giuliano Carnimeo
Medical-themed films
1980s Italian-language films
1980s Italian films